The Ministry of Science and Technology (Bijñāna ō prayukti Montronaloya) (abbreviated as MOST)  is a ministry of the government of Bangladesh which coordinates science and technology activities in Bangladesh.

History 
National Museum of Science and Technology was the best organization under the ministry for the 2019-2020 year.

Agencies and departments under the MOST
 Bangladesh Atomic Energy Commission (BAEC)
 Bangladesh Council of Scientific and Industrial Research (BCSIR)
 National Museum of Science and Technology (NMST)
 Bangladesh National Scientific and Technical Documentation Centre (BANSDOC)
 Bangabandhu Sheikh Mujibur Rahman Novo Theatre
 Bangladesh Atomic Energy Regulatory Authority (BAERA)
 National Institute of Biotechnology (NIB)
 Bangladesh Oceanographic Research Institute (BORI)
 Nuclear Power Plant Company Bangladesh Limited
 Bangabandhu Science and Technology Fellowship Trust (BSTFT)

See also
Government of Bangladesh
Science and technology in Bangladesh

References

 
Government ministries of Bangladesh
Science and technology in Bangladesh
Bangladesh